Josh Breed (born 20 March 1999) is a South African cricketer. He made his List A debut on 22 December 2019, for Western Province in the 2019–20 CSA Provincial One-Day Challenge. Prior to his List A debut, he also played in second XI matches for Worcestershire County Cricket Club in England during 2019.

References

External links
 

1999 births
Living people
South African cricketers
Western Province cricketers
Place of birth missing (living people)